The 2014 FIA World Rallycross Championship presented by Monster Energy was the first edition of the FIA World Rallycross Championship. The season consisted of twelve rounds and started on 3 May with the Portuguese round at Montalegre. The season came to end on 23 November, at San Luis, Argentina.

Calendar

Teams and drivers

Results and standings

FIA World Rallycross Championship for Drivers
(key)

FIA World Rallycross Championship for Teams

See also
FIA European Rallycross Championship

References

External links

 
World Rallycross Championship seasons
World Rallycross Championship